Wuyi Square station is a subway station in Changsha, Hunan, China, operated by the Changsha subway operator Changsha Metro.

Station layout
The station has two side platforms for Line 1 and one island platform for Line 2.

Floors

Entrance

History
The station opened on 29 April 2014.

Surrounding area

Changsha Pedestrian Street (Chinese: 长沙步行街)
Heiwado Department Store (Chinese: 平和堂商贸大厦)
Crowne Plaza (Chinese: 皇冠假日酒店)

References

Railway stations in Hunan
Railway stations in China opened in 2014